The album discography of the Cuban-American singer Gloria Estefan consists of fourteen studio albums, fourteen compilations, and four EPs (not including Estefan's releases with her band, the Miami Sound Machine). Estefan's career sales is estimated at over 75 million records sold worldwide which made her one of the most successful female Latin crossover artists. According to RIAA, Estefan has sold 15.5 million certified albums in the United States. Hailed as the reigning "Queen of Latin Pop", she has achieved 38 number one hits across all Billboard charts. Billboard listed her as the 23rd Greatest of all-time Latin artist.

Although they had been recording since the mid-1970s, Estefan's breakthrough came when Miami Sound Machine released the single "Dr. Beat" in Europe in 1984. Though a major hit there, the band did not make a commercial impact in the United States until the following year with the release of the single "Conga", which became a signature song for Estefan. Both of the corresponding albums (Eyes of Innocence and Primitive Love) were credited to Miami Sound Machine. Their next album, 1987's Let It Loose (titled as Anything for You in Europe) was credited to Gloria Estefan and Miami Sound Machine. All further albums after 1989's Cuts Both Ways onwards were credited solely to Estefan herself, though Miami Sound Machine continues to be her backing band and perform with her live to the present day.

Estefan has also recorded many albums in Spanish, and her 1993 album, Mi Tierra, is one of the most successful Spanish-language albums released in the United States. The album was also an international hit and became the first album in Spain to gain a Diamond certification (for sales in excess of 1 million copies).

Gloria Estefan

Studio albums

Compilations

Extended plays

Miami Sound Machine (1977–1989)

This section includes the discography for the band Miami Sound Machine, led by Estefan and Emilio Estefan Jr.

The band formed in 1977 and released a total of eleven studio albums, one compilation and two remix EPs. The first seven studio albums released by the group were entirely in Spanish. Their first English-language release was their 1984 album, Eyes of Innocence, which featured the European hit "Dr. Beat". Success in the United States came the following year with the release of the single "Conga", taken from the album Primitive Love, which has since been certified Triple Platinum in the US.

By 1987, the group were credited as Gloria Estefan & Miami Sound Machine for the album Let It Loose (released in Europe as Anything for You). The album became the band's biggest seller, though no further releases were credited to Miami Sound Machine from 1991 onwards when Estefan effectively became a solo artist (though the band were credited on the inner cover of her 1989 album Cuts Both Ways before dropping their name in that same year). Since the 1990s, the members of Miami Sound Machine continue to be credited individually as session musicians on Estefan's albums, and they continue to be her backing band during live performances.

Studio albums

Compilations

See also
List of best-selling music artists

References

 
Latin pop music discographies
Discographies of Cuban artists
Discographies of American artists
Tropical music discographies